Bainch Baja is a village  in the Hoshiarpur district of Punjab, India. It is located five kilometers from the National Highway 1A.

It has a population is around 5000; the electoral roll has around 3500 people. It is administered by Panchayat raj.

References 

Hoshiarpur
Villages in Hoshiarpur district